John Henry Lockton (22 May 1892 – 29 June 1972) was an English cricketer and footballer. He played 32 first-class cricket matches for Surrey between 1919 and 1926 and played as an inside left in the Football League for Nottingham Forest.

Personal life 
Lockton was educated at Dulwich College and served in the British Armed Forces during the First World War. He taught at St Dunstan's College in Catford for 38 years before retiring in 1952.

Football career statistics

References

External links
 

1892 births
1972 deaths
People educated at Dulwich College
English cricketers
Surrey cricketers
Footballers from Peckham
English Football League players
British military personnel of World War I
Nottingham Forest F.C. players
Association football inside forwards
English footballers
Ilford F.C. players
Casuals F.C. players
Nunhead F.C. players